The 1940 Richmond Spiders football team was an American football team that represented the University of Richmond as a member of the Southern Conference (SoCon) during the 1940 college football season. In their seventh season under head coach Glenn Thistlethwaite, Richmond compiled a 6–3 record, with a mark of 3–2 in conference play, finishing tied for fifth place in the SoCon.

Schedule

References

Richmond
Richmond Spiders football seasons
Richmond Spiders football